Altoona Works (also known as Altoona Terminal) is a large railroad industrial complex in Altoona, Pennsylvania.  It was built between 1850 and 1925 by the Pennsylvania Railroad (PRR), to supply the railroad with locomotives, railroad cars and related equipment. For many years, it was the largest railroad shop complex in the world.

History
In 1849, PRR officials developed plans to construct a repair facility at a town newly established for this purpose, Altoona. Construction was started in 1850, and soon a long building was completed in the 12th Street area that housed a machine shop, woodworking shop, blacksmith shop, locomotive repair shop and foundry.

The 12th Street area facilities were replaced later by the Altoona Machine Shops. The first locomotive was built there in 1866. A total of 6,783 steam, diesel and electric locomotives were manufactured in Altoona between 1866 and 1946.

In time, additional PRR repair facilities were located in Harrisburg, Pittsburgh, Renovo and Mifflin, and the Altoona Works expanded in adjacent Juniata. Inventor Alexander Graham Bell sent two assistants to the Altoona shops in 1875 to study the feasibility of installing telephone lines.

In 1875, the Altoona Works started a testing department for PRR equipment. In following years, the Pennsylvania Railroad led the nation in the development of research and testing procedures of practical value for the railroad industry. In 1905, a Stationary Testing Plant was installed at Altoona, after originally being installed and used for locomotive testing in 1904, as one of the PRR System exhibits at the Louisiana Purchase Exposition in St. Louis. Locomotives tested on the plant included T1 4-4-4-4 No.6110 and Baldwin No. 60,000  Use of the testing facilities was discontinued in 1968, and many of the structures were demolished.

In May 1877, telephone lines were installed for various departments to communicate with one another.

Portions of the complex are still in use by Norfolk Southern Railway (NS).

During World War II, PRR facilities (including the Altoona Shops) were on target lists of German saboteurs involved in Operation Pastorius. They were caught before they could complete their missions. By 1945, the Altoona Works had grown to be one of the largest repair and construction facilities for locomotives and cars in the world.

Current facilities
Today, NS runs a locomotive shop at Juniata with about 450 employees. The Railroaders Memorial Museum is next to Altoona Works.

Major facilities (1920s)
 Altoona Machine Shops (renamed 12th St Car Shop in 1928)
 Built steam locomotives during 1866-1904
 Later in the 20th century it handled locomotive repair and manufacture of engine parts
 Altoona Car Shops
 Built 1869
 Manufactured freight cars and passenger cars
Juniata Locomotive Shop

 Built 1888-1890; expanded 1924-25
 Built steam and electric locomotives during 1891-1946
 Included a paint shop, boiler shop, blacksmith shop, boiler house, erecting shop, two-story machine shop, electric and hydraulic house, two-story office and storeroom, paint storehouse and gas house, and hydraulic transfer table and pit.
 Repair work only in the mid-20th century
 Builds and remanufactures locomotives today
 South Altoona Foundries
Manufactured cast iron and brass castings

Map of Altoona Works

See also
List of locomotive builders

References

External links

Buildings and structures in Altoona, Pennsylvania
Conrail
Industrial buildings and structures in Pennsylvania
Locomotive manufacturers of the United States
Manufacturing plants in the United States
Norfolk Southern Railway
Penn Central Transportation
Pennsylvania Railroad
Rail infrastructure in Pennsylvania
Railway workshops in the United States
Historic American Engineering Record in Pennsylvania
Altoona, Pennsylvania
Blacksmith shops
Manufacturing companies based in Pennsylvania